Saurauia oreophila is a species of plant in the Actinidiaceae family. It is found in Guatemala and Mexico. It is threatened by habitat loss.

References

oreophila
Vulnerable plants
Taxonomy articles created by Polbot
Trees of Mexico
Trees of Guatemala
Cloud forest flora of Mexico